William "Jimmy" Dummett (18 July 1840 – 3 May 1900) was an Australian cricketer. He played three first-class matches for New South Wales between 1876/77 and 1877/78.

See also
 List of New South Wales representative cricketers

References

External links
 

1840 births
1900 deaths
Australian cricketers
New South Wales cricketers
Cricketers from Sydney